The International Arts and Entertainment Alliance (IAEA) is a global union federation (GUF) representing trade unions of performers and technicians in the music and audiovisual sectors.

The alliance has three sections: the International Federation of Actors (FIA), the International Federation of Musicians (FIM), and the Media, Entertainment and Arts section of the UNI Global Union (UNI-MEI).  Trade unions affiliate to the appropriate section; 90 unions hold membership of the International Federation of Actors, and 70 unions hold membership of the International Federation of Musicians.

In 2007, the alliance joined the Council of Global Unions.

References

Global union federations
Trade unions established in 1997